Sebastian Ohlsson (born March 4, 1997) is a Swedish professional ice hockey player. He is currently playing with Modo Hockey of the HockeyAllsvenskan (Allsv).

Ohlsson made his Swedish Hockey League debut playing with Skellefteå AIK during the 2014–15 SHL season. He has also featured with Timrå IK in the SHL.

References

External links

1997 births
Living people
Modo Hockey players
Skellefteå AIK players
Swedish ice hockey forwards
Timrå IK players